Stictomyia longicornis is a species of ulidiid or picture-winged fly in the genus Stictomyia of the family Ulidiidae.

Distribution
Mexico.

References

Insects described in 1885
Ulidiidae
Diptera of North America
Taxa named by Jacques-Marie-Frangile Bigot